In early June 2020, heavy rains caused by the regional rainy season led to floods severely affecting large areas of southern China including the Yangtze basin and its tributaries. Rains and floods extended to central and eastern China during July and were described as the worst since at least 1998.

According to the Ministry of Emergency Management, by the end of June flooding had displaced 744,000 people across 26 provinces with 81 people missing or dead. As of 13 August, the floods have affected 63.46 million people and caused a direct economic loss of 178.96 billion CNY, which are 12.7% and 15.5% higher than the 2015-2019 average, respectively. 219 people were found dead or are missing, and 54,000 houses collapsed, which is 54.8% and 65.3% lower than the 2015-2019 average, respectively. The Ministry of Water Resources said that a total of 443 rivers nationwide have been flooded, with 33 of them swelling to the highest levels ever recorded. According to statistics from the National Cultural Heritage Administration (NCHA), 76 key national cultural relics and 187 provincial cultural heritage sites have suffered damage of varying degrees.

Affected regions include Guangxi, Guizhou, Sichuan, Hubei, and Chongqing. The regions include the upper and middle river basin of the Yangtze and its tributaries. With more rain, floods started to extend to lower regions of the Yangtze basin such as Anhui, Jiangxi, and Zhejiang. Hunan, Fujian, and Yunnan were also affected.

Causes of floods

Natural causes
Hu Xiao from the China Meteorological Administration (CMA) indicated that the rains were caused by increased vapors arising from the Indian and Pacific oceans.
Some experts claim climate change is partly to blame and such events may become more frequent in the future.

Artificial causes
The local governments in recent years had made steps to implement nature-based flood mitigation strategies like tree planting, sponge cities and floodplain restoration. Experts have noted these measures did have some positive effect as the intensity of precipitation in 2020 is much higher than the rains that caused the 1998 floods, yet the flooding has been less serious and damaging. However, huge challenges in flood management and resilience remain. The Yangtze flows through some of the most productive agricultural, economic and industrial centers in China. With the rapid increase of population in China and breakneck economic growth, a large number of lakes and other wetlands had been reclaimed into farmland or urban development. The serious shrinkage and disappearance of lakes in the middle and lower reaches of the Yangtze River is an important reason for the aggravation of flood disasters.
In 2000, it was only . In 2000, it was only . Hubei was once known as "The Province of a thousand of Lakes". In the late 1950s, there were 1,066 lakes in Hubei. By the early 1980s, only 309 were left.

Three Gorges Dam 

It was constructed not only for power generation but also for flood control. By the end of June, the dam had started to release floodwaters. While the CMA indicated flood discharge started on 29 June, satellite images suggest that floodgates were opened already five days earlier. Yichang, a city below the dam, experienced extensive flooding, raising questions about the effectiveness of the flood control by the dam. According to the company that manages the dam, the dam had been "effectively reducing the speed and extent of water level rises on the middle and lower reaches of the Yangtze". Critics, however, suggest that the dam is "not doing what it is designed for" and unable to deal with severe events. Other experts have pointed out that studies do show that the dam does help alleviate typical flooding during normal years and that the problem is not the design of the dam, but the public's expectation that the dam alone can solve all the problems of flooding on the Yangtze. Particularly, when significant amounts of rainfall occurred downstream of the Three Gorges Dam in the middle and lower reaches of the Yangtze which will never pass through the dam. During July, three flood waves from rains in the upper Yangtze basin arrived at the dam, necessitating the opening of sluice gates multiple times to create space in the reservoir. In Chinese social media it was claimed that this exacerbated downstream flooding, while the dam operators maintained that the action helped to delay floodwaters going downstream. On 15 August, "Flood #4" passed through the Three Gorges reservoir with a maximum inflow of 62,000 cubic meters per second, the highest reached at that time during this flood season. "Flood #5" passed the dam by 22 August when the reservoir's water level reached 167.85 metres, the highest level ever recorded.

According to a member of the expert committee of the state-sanctioned National Disaster Reduction Centre, the restrictions in human flow during the COVID-19 pandemic in mainland China halted regular dam maintenance, dam inspection, training of officials and the construction of hydraulic projects, which were scheduled in the winter and spring of 2020.

Flooding by province

Anhui

Some road sections and communities were submerged.

On 6 July, Lecheng Bridge, a Qing dynasty stone arch bridge and provincial cultural relics protection unit in Sanxi Town of Jingde County, was destroyed. On 7 July, some houses along the Shuiyang River in Xuanzhou District of Xuancheng were submerged.

On 7 July, several reservoirs in She County filled over capacity and reached record levels, requiring large releases of water to alleviate the dangerously high storage of water. Homes in She County were inundated. The first day of the National College Entrance Examination (Gaokao) was postponed due to hard rain. On 7 July 2020, Zhenhai Bridge, a large stone arch bridge in Tunxi District of Huangshan City and a "Major Historical and Cultural Site Protected at the National Level in Anhui", was destroyed by mountain torrents.

On 9 July, Yaodu River and Longquan River in Dongzhi County exceeded the highest water level in history.

All residents in Laozhou Township and Xuba Township of Tongling along the Yangtze River were ordered to evacuate on 11 July.

On 14 July, an emergency was issued by the Office of Anhui Provincial Flood Control and Drought Relief, which ordered all residents living in the central island of the Yangtze River or along the Yangtze River in Anqing, Chizhou, Tongling, Wuhu and Maanshan to evacuate.

On 16 July, in Tietong Township of Zongyang County, all the remaining 2,272 people were evacuated except 176 left behind.

On 18 July, the Huai River Commission of the Ministry of Water Resources raised the flood-control response from Level III to Level II.

On 19 July, the Government of Quanjiao County blasted several gaps in Chu River Levee to release floods.

At 8:32 am on 20 July, the Government of Nan County opened sluice gates at Wangjia Dam on the Huai River because water there was building up to too high a level. The last flood discharge was 13 years ago.

At 10:24 a.m. on 21 July, the water level at Zhongmiao Station of Chaohu reached , which is the once-in-a-century water level of Chaohu.

On 22 July, five excavators were washed away by the flood in Shida Levee, Lujiang County. That same day, a firefighter named Chen Lu was swept away by the burst flood while searching for trapped people in Lujiang County.

On 23 July, in Chaohu, affected by the continuous heavy rainfall, the water level of the Zhegao River rose and streets of Zhegao Town were submerged.

Chongqing
On 22 June, parts of Qijiang District's Wenlong Subdistrict were submerged, with some roads underwater. 13,874 residents in Qijiang District along the Qi River were ordered to evacuate on 22 June.

On 27 July, affected by persistent heavy rainfall, the first floor of the shops in the town of Ciqikou alongside the Yangtze River were inundated. Parts of Yuzhong District and entire Caiyuanba Building Materials Market and Fruit Market near swollen river were inundated.

As of August 16, 2020 the center of the city of Chongqing was flooded under  of water after the Jialing River overflowed due to heavy rainfall.

Downtown streets, houses, parks, and wharves, were inundated.

Gansu
China National Highway 212 was partially washed away, effectively cutting off Wen County from the outside world for three days.

Fujian
From 11 to 14 June, a torrential rainfall hit Youyang Tujia and Miao Autonomous County and Shizhu Tujia Autonomous County. On 14 June, Huaxia Minzu School was inundated. On 22 June, homes in Youyang Tujia and Miao Autonomous County were also inundated.

On 9 July, a rainstorm occurred in Nanping, causing floods, landslides and other disasters, many roads were destroyed and crops were flooded. Wuyishan City had serious waterlogging, and the local government issued a rainstorm red warning signal, and Wuyishan Scenic Spot had been closed.

Guangdong
On 22 May, the largest one hour rainfall in 2020 in China is Huangpu Bridge of Guangzhou, . Line 13 of Guangzhou Metro was shut down due to floodwater flowing into the subway tunnel.

Roads and highways were severely damaged or destroyed in Longmen County.

Guangxi
The county seat was underwater when the torrential rainfall hit.

National Highway G321 and G323, G65 Baotou–Maoming Expressway, and G59 Hohhot–Beihai Expressway were closed due to landslides. In  of Yufeng District, Liuzhou, homes, streets and businesses was underwater when the torrential rainfall hit.

Guizhou
Throughout the county, 8 people were killed and 5 were missing.

At 7:00 a.m. on 14 June, a total of 438,000 people in 51 counties of 8 cities in Guizhou were affected, 10 people died, 14 people were missing, 21,000 people were forced to evacuate; nearly 100 houses collapsed and more than 8,000 houses were badly damaged;  of crops were affected, including  will have no harvest; and the direct economic loss was 880 million yuan.

In 26 June, the torrential rainfall hit Rongjiang County, resulting in a direct economic loss of 4.8 million yuan due to rural roads in the county sustained major damage.

At 7:05 a.m. on 8 July, at least six people were killed when a landslide occurred in Shiban village of Songtao Miao Autonomous County.

Loushanguan Scenic Spot was also closed.

Hubei
As of 13 July in Hubei province, at least 14 people were dead, and five others were missing. Over nine million people were affected.

At 12:00 p.m. on 6 July, the dam slipped and deformed, and 29,000 people were evacuated.

On 17 July, in Enshi City, the streets and cars were covered in water. All roads were closed in and out of the city.

The Three Gorges Dam ushered in the largest flood peak since the construction of the dam.

Hunan
On 29 June, a rainstorm hit in Fenghuang County, Xiangxi Tujia and Miao Autonomous Prefecture. The landscape and roads on both sides of Tuo River were inundated.

On 3 July, the Government of Hunan launched a Level IV emergency response, the lowest in China's four-tier emergency response system, for flood control.

On 8 July, Madian Reservoir of Yueyang County received  of rainfall in total, representing the highest accumulated rainfall since 1952.

On 8 July, in northwestern Hunan's Zhangjiajie, a man netting fish was swept away by the flood.

Hunan Hydrological and Water Resources Survey Center issued an orange flood warning at 12:20 p.m. on 11 July. At 2:00 p.m. on 11 July, Orange Isle was closed.

On 20 July, the Government of Hunan announced that as of 20 July, persistent heavy rainfall has affected more than 6.01 million people in 117 counties of 14 prefectures in Hunan, and more than 347,000 people have been transferred and resettled urgently.

Jiangxi
Jiangxi experienced major floods in July 2020, primarily along the Poyang Lake and its tributaries in Jiujiang, Shangrao, and Pingxiang.

Jiangzhou is an island in the middle of Yangtze River at the end of the Poyang lake, local government issued a call on social media for everyone from the town aged 18 to 60 to return and help fight the flood, citing a severe lack of hands to reinforce dams.

On 11 July, the Government of Jiangxi raised its flood-control response from level II to level I, the top level of China's four-tier emergency response for floods. Parks, homes, and businesses in Poyang County were overtaken by the Rao River, leaving parts of the county accessible only by boat. The 73123 Army of the Eastern Theater Command Ground Force rushed to Poyang County to fight flood. In Dongzhi County, floods had affected more than 260,000 people, or about half of the county's population.

On the afternoon of 8 July, Qinghua Rainbow Bridge was devastated by flood.

Sichuan
On 17 June, heavy rain triggered mudslides and flooding that leaves 2 people missing in Danba County.

From 18 pm 26 June to 1 am on 27 June, a sudden rainstorm occurred in northern Mianning County. National Highway 248 collapsed in the county seat , causing two passing vehicles to fall into river. Only five of the ten passengers were rescued, two died and three were missing. As of 1 July,  of crops were affected,  were damaged and  will have no harvest, more than 280 houses collapsed or badly damaged and 2,300 houses partially damaged.

On 16 July, in Tongchuan District of Dazhou, 7 people went swimming in the river and 2 people were washed away by floods.

In early August, continuous rainfall has caused 22 major rivers in Sichuan to exceed their flood warning levels. Ya'an and Leshan were underwater when the torrential rainfall hit. 100,000 people were evacuated.

On 17 August, in Leshan, floods affected the Leshan Giant Buddha, flood water reached the toes of the Buddha statue for the first time since the establishment of the Communist State in 1949. Local police and scenic area staff placed sandbags at the platform under the statue's feet, building a dam-like structure to protect it.

On 18 August, the Government of Sichuan launched its Level I emergency response, which is the first time in the history of Sichuan. In Jiuzhaigou County, the Jiuzhaigou Valley Scenic and Historic Interest Area announced temporary closure due to safety concerns. The Yan'an section of Qingyi River was hit by a major flood rarely seen in a hundred years. The lower reaches of Dadu River and Min River were exceeded warning levels. In Pingshan County of Yibin, the government evacuated 2,400 of its residents due to flooding.

On 21 August, days of heavy rainfall triggered a landslide, causing seven people deaths and two missing.

Yunnan
From the evening of 29 to 30 June, a heavy rainstorm occurred in Zhenxiong County, Yiliang County, Weixin County and Yanjin County. The level of Baishui River, a tributary of the Yangtze River, had risen , causing serious floods in towns and townships along the river. As of 21:00 on 30 June,  of crops such as corn, potatoes and tobacco were affected,  were damaged and  will have no harvest, and more than 90 houses collapsed, 59 houses badly damaged and 90 houses partially damaged.

Zhejiang

On 29 May, Chunan County suffered the strongest plum rain in history. On 8 July, the level of Qiandao Lake reached its highest level in history. At 9:00 a.m. on 8 July, Xin'an River Hydropower Station began to discharge flood. This is the first time since the completion of the hydropower station that all 9 gates have been fully opened for flood discharge.

Government actions
The Chinese government allocated about 309 million yuan (44.2 million U.S. dollars) for disaster relief in flood-hit regions. On 8 and 12 July, Chinese Communist Party (CCP) general secretary and paramount leader Xi Jinping as well as Premier Li Keqiang called successively for all-out efforts in rescue and relief operations in flooded areas across China and stressed that ensuring people's lives and safety is a top priority.

On the evening of 12 July, more than 7,000 officers and soldiers of the 71st Group Army and the 72nd Group Army went to Jiujiang and Tongling to participate in flood fighting and emergency rescue tasks. On the morning of 14 July, more than 3,700 officers and soldiers from the 73rd Group Army rushed to Yugan County to fight against floods and deal with emergencies. On 14 July, according to the order of the Central Military Commission, more than 16,000 officers and soldiers were sent to Jiujiang, Shangrao and other areas of Jiangxi to fight floods. At 23:00 on 19 July, the officials of the Central Theater Command arrived in Wuhan, Hubei to command flood fighting and disaster relief. On 22 July, the Chinese government channeled 830 million yuan (119.05 million U.S. dollars) from its central budget to restore water conservancy and agricultural production facilities in 12 provincial flood-hit regions. On 19 August, CCP general secretary Xi Jinping visited Wangjiaba Dam on the Huai River and other flood-hit areas in Fuyang. That same day, Premier Li Keqiang arrived in Chongqing to assess conditions, visiting the village of Shuangba and the historic town of Ciqikou.

See also
 2021 China floods 
 2020 Kyushu floods
 2020 Nepal floods
 2020 Assam floods 
 2020 Korean floods
 2020 Central Vietnam floods

References

External links
 

2020 disasters in China
Articles containing video clips
Floods in China
History of Anhui
History of Chongqing
History of Guangxi
History of Guizhou
History of Hubei
History of Jiangxi
History of Sichuan
History of Zhejiang
2020 floods in Asia